Varalakshmi or Varalaxmi might refer to:

 Varalakshmi, another name for the goddess Lakshmi, especially on the day of Varalakshmi Vratam
G. Varalakshmi, veteran South Indian film actress
P. R. Varalakshmi, South Indian film actress
S. Varalakshmi, veteran South Indian film actress and singer
Varalaxmi Sarathkumar (born 1985), South Indian film actress

Feminine given names